A referendum concerning the closing hour for licensed premises and registered clubs was put to voters in New South Wales on 15 February 1954.

Background
Six o'clock closing was introduced in New South Wales during the First World War following the 1916 referendum. The 1916 vote was influenced by a recent riot involving drunken soldiers. In February 1916, troops mutinied against conditions at the Casula Camp. They raided hotels in Liverpool before travelling by train to Sydney, where one soldier was shot dead in a riot at Central Railway station.<noinclude> Although it was introduced as a temporary measure, the government brought in extensions and discussed putting the matter to a referendum. In 1923, however, without testing the matter by a popular vote, the Fuller Nationalist government enacted 6 pm as the closing time.

The question
The voting paper was:
The elector shall indicate his vote by placing the number "1" in the square opposite the closing hour for which he desires to give his first preference vote, and the number "2" in the remaining square.

Results
The referendum was narrowly in favour of 10:00 pm closing time.

Aftermath
This was the second of three referendums concerning the closing hour for licensed premises and clubs.

See also 
 Referendums in New South Wales

References

1954 referendums
Referendums in New South Wales
February 1954 events in Australia
1950s in New South Wales
Alcohol law
Alcohol in Australia